The Cranbrook Colts were a Junior "B" and a Junior "A" team in Cranbrook, British Columbia. They were formed in 1970 as a Junior "B" team in the Kootenay International Junior Hockey League. They were immediately successful, winning the league title in their first four years. The Colts jumped to the Junior "A" Rocky Mountain Junior Hockey League in 1991, winning three league titles in their seven years in the league.

The Colts folded in 1998 and with that, the whole league (RMJHL) the year after folded, because of the forming of the Kootenay Ice in Cranbrook, British Columbia, a major junior team in the Western Hockey League. The Ice relocated to Winnipeg, Manitoba after the 2018-19 WHL season, going back once again to junior "A" in the BCHL for the 2020-21 BCHL season, as the Cranbrook Bucks.

Championships
Kootenay International Junior Hockey League: 1972, 1973, 1974, 1975, 1976, 1982, 1983, 1984, 1985, 1986, 1987.
Cyclone Taylor Cup: 1974, 1975, 1982, 1984, 1985, 1986, 1987.
Rocky Mountain Junior Hockey League: 1995, 1997, 1998.

History
In 1971, the Cranbrook Colts joined the KIJHL with a partial schedule.  After going undefeated in nineteen games, Colts went on to win the league playoff title.  For much of the 1970s, the Colts were the elite of the KIJHL and amongst the best British Columbia Junior B hockey had to offer.  The Colts went on to win KIJHL playoff titles in 1972, 1973, 1974, 1975, and 1976, topping this off with Cyclone Taylor Cups as Provincial Champions in 1974 and 1975.

In the early 1980s, the Colts came back to their winning ways, taking league titles in 1982, 1983, 1984, 1985, 1986, and 1987. They completed this dynastic run by winning the Cyclone Taylor Cup a total of five times, first in 1982, then consecutively in 1984, 1985, 1986, and 1987.

In 1991, the Colts joined the Peace-Cariboo Junior Hockey League with a group of other KIJHL teams to form the Kootenay Division of what was to now be known as the Rocky Mountain Junior Hockey League.  The PCJHL had been a tiny Junior "A" league bridging the British Columbia-Alberta North-Central border since 1980.  The Southern expansion into the Kootenays was an effort to increase the talent pool and to venture into an area that British Columbia Junior Hockey League had yet to claim.  The Colts would continue to dominate, even as a Junior "A" team, winning league championships in 1995, 1997, and 1998.

In 1998, the Western Hockey League's Edmonton Ice was failing and was sold and moved to Cranbrook.  The Colts folded to make way for the Major Junior team.

Season-by-season standings

Playoffs
1992 Lost Semi-final
Cranbrook Colts defeated Fernie Ghostriders 4-games-to-none
Trail Smoke Eaters defeated Cranbrook Colts 4-games-to-3
1993 Lost Final
Cranbrook Colts defeated Kimberley Dynamiters 4-games-to-2
Cranbrook Colts defeated Trail Smoke Eaters 4-games-to-2
Williams Lake Mustangs defeated Cranbrook Colts 3-games-to-2
1994 Lost Semi-final
Cranbrook Colts defeated Creston Valley Thunder 4-games-to-1
Kimberley Dynamiters defeated Cranbrook Colts 4-games-to-1
1995 Won League, Lost Mowat Cup
Cranbrook Colts defeated Kimberley Dynamiters 4-games-to-none
Cranbrook Colts defeated Creston Valley Thunder 4-games-to-none
Cranbrook Colts defeated Prince George Spruce Kings 4-games-to-2 RMJHL CHAMPIONS
Chilliwack Chiefs (BCHL) defeated Cranbrook Colts 3-games-to-none
1996 Lost Quarter-final
Kimberley Dynamiters defeated Cranbrook Colts 4-games-to-2
1997 Won League, Lost Mowat Cup
Kimberley Dynamiters defeated Cranbrook Colts 4-games-to-3 
Cranbrook Colts defeated Nelson Leafs 4-games-to-none 
Cranbrook Colts defeated Fernie Ghostriders 4-games-to-none RMJHL CHAMPIONS
South Surrey Eagles (BCHL) defeated Cranbrook Colts 3-games-to-none
1998 Won League, Lost Mowat Cup
Cranbrook Colts defeated Fernie Ghostriders 4-games-to-1
Cranbrook Colts defeated Kimberley Dynamiters 4-games-to-3 RMJHL CHAMPIONS
South Surrey Eagles (BCHL) defeated Cranbrook Colts 3-games-to-none

Notable alumni
Jon Klemm
Brad Lukowich
Bob Murdoch

External links
BC Hockey

Cranbrook, British Columbia
Ice hockey teams in British Columbia
1971 establishments in British Columbia
1988 disestablishments in British Columbia
Ice hockey clubs established in 1971
Ice hockey clubs disestablished in 1988